Hans-Joachim Heist (born January 11, 1949 in Seeheim-Jugenheim) is a German actor and comedian.

Life 
Heist works as actor and comedian in television programs on German broadcasters. In German satire programme heute-show on German broadcaster ZDF he plays the role of "Gernot Hassknecht".

Filmography 

 1982–2006: Ein Fall für zwei (8 episodes) 
 1985–1994: Diese Drombuschs (5 episodes)
 1992: Das Nest – Motorraddiebe
 1994: Schwarz greift ein – Mutterfreuden
 1995: Der Leihmann
 1997: Das Amt – Das Gerücht
 1998: Gisbert
 1999: Die Camper – Die Jagd
 1999: Die Strandclique
 1999: Tatort – Der Heckenschütze
 2000: 
 2000: Fandango
 2000: Ich beiß zurück
 2000: 7 Tage im Paradies
 2001: Große Liebe wider Willen
 2001: Ritas Welt
 2001: Durch Dick und Dünn
 2001: Alarm für Cobra 11 – Die Autobahnpolizei
 2002: If It Don't Fit, Use a Bigger Hammer
 2002: Tatort – 1000 Tode
 2002: Nikola
 2002: Natalie V – Im Spinnennetz des Babystrich
 2003: Die Camper – Der Sträfling
 2003–2005: Cologne P.D. (10 episodes)
 2003: Klassentreffen
 2004: Wilsberg – Tödliche Freundschaft
 2004: Liebe hat Vorfahrt
 2004: Der Staatsanwalt – Henkersmahlzeit
 2004: Frech wie Janine
 2004: Pfarrer Braun – Bruder Mord
 2005: Abschnitt 40 – Sicherstellung
 2005: Sehnsucht nach Rimini
 2005: Tatort – 
 2006: Polizeiruf 110 – Die Mutter von Monte Carlo
 2006: Die Sterneköchin als Schlosser
 2006: Tatort – Sterben für die Erben
 2006: Alles Atze
 2006: Pastewka
 2006: Bloch
 2007: Der Lehrer
 2007: Die Dinge zwischen uns
 2007: Das Prinzip Lena
 2008: Familie Dr. Kleist – Katastrophen
 2008: No Escape 
 2008: John Rabe
 2009: 
 2009: Tatort – 
 2009: Wer hat Rheinland-Pfalz gemacht?
 since 2009: heute-show
 2010: A Quiet Life
 2010: Alles was Recht ist – Sein oder Nichtsein
 2010: Tiere bis unters Dach (2 episodes)
 2011: Götter wie wir
 2012: 
 2013: Kückückskind
 2013: SOKO 5113 (episodes 521)
 2013: No-Eared Bunny and Two-Eared Chick
 2014: "Respekt für meine Rechte"
 2015: Inside Out (Stimme der Wut for Lewis Black)
 2015: Löwenzahn
 2016: Bettys Diagnose, episode 14, "Schonungslos" (figur: Horst Schwadtke)
 2016: Stuttgart Homicide, episode 169, "Dirty Harry" (figur: Dietmar Notz)
 2016: Lafer!Lichter!Lecker!
 2016: Verliebt in Amsterdam

Stage works 
 1985: Komm raus aus dem Schrank as Willy Briggs
 1989: Sextett as Dennys
 1991: Doppelt Leben hält länger as Stanley Gardner
 1991: Der arme Cyrano as Ragueneaou
 1995: Der fröhliche Weinberg as Karl Eismayer
 1996: Ein Traum von Hochzeit as Tom
 1996: Sommernachtstraum as Schreiner Schnock / Philostrat
 2001: Dreigroschenoper as Mathias Münz
 2004: Im Name der Rose as Severin
 2004: Die drei Musketiere als Bonacieux
 2006–2011: Der Kontrabass as Kontrabassist
 2006–2016:  Die Sternstunde des Josef Bieder as Requisiteur
 2007–2009: Allein in der Sauna as Kalle König
 2008–2016: Noch'n Gedicht der große Heinz Erhardt Abend as Heinz Erhardt
 2012–2013: Der Geizige as Kommissar
 2013–2016: Das Hassknecht Prinzip – in zwölf Schritten zum Choleriker
 2017– : Hassknecht LIVE – Jetzt wird's persönlich

Awards 
 1999: Fachmedienpreis in "Comedy"  for "James" in "Dinner for one“
 2009, 2010, 2011, 2012: Deutscher Comedypreis for member in  "ZDF – heute show“
 2010 und 2014: Deutscher Fernsehpreis in category "Beste Comedy" for "ZDF – heute show“
 2010: Adolf-Grimme-Preis for "ZDF – heute show“
 2012: Hanns-Joachim-Friedrichs-Preis für Oliver Welke und sein Team
 2013: Die Holzisch Latern des Karnevalvereins Dieburg, für besondere Dienste um das Brauchtum.
 2014: Bambi Award for "ZDF – heute show“
 2015: Ehrenbrief des Landes Hessen
 2017: Goldene Kamera 2017 for "ZDF – heute show“
 2017: Deutscher Comedypreis, Beste Satire-Show: „ZDF – heute show“

References

External links 
 Personal website (in German)
 
 WAZ.de: "Ich lehne die GroKo ab" (in German)
 Focus.de: Kabarett: Hans-Joachim Heist: Noch’n Gedicht (in German)
 NOZ-de: Hans-Joachim Heist über seine Rolle als Gernot Hassknecht (in German)
 Sueddeutsche.de: Der wütendendste Mann des deutschen Fernsehens (in German)
 Deutschlandfunk.de: Der Hassprediger der heute show (in German)

German male stage actors
20th-century German male actors
21st-century German male actors
German male comedians
1949 births
Living people